Fernando Asián  (born 1951) is a Spanish-Venezuelan artist.

Early life
He was a story writer for Chiqui de la Fuente's comics. From this first collaboration grew many others, including the "Genicabra" and "Gag" series for the Barcelona Junior Gazette.
He was the founder of Madrid's Diario Pueblo's El Cuco Sunday supplement, introducing series such as "El Soñador" and "XB1".
He wrote the first anti-war comic under Franco's Spain. When he denied to commit to drafting, he moved to England, publishing his works on BBC and IPC magazines.
Through SI Artists and Temple Art in London, he collaborates internationally, such as with "Zodiac" and "Johannes" published in Tarot magazine.

Awards
 Emilio Boggio Award
 Caracas Metro Award

References

 This article was initially translated from the Spanish Wikipedia.

Venezuelan sculptors
Venezuelan painters
1951 births
Living people